Selitë is a neighborhood of Tirana in the former municipality of Farkë in Tirana County, Albania. At the 2015 local government reform it became part of the municipality Tirana.

References

Populated places in Tirana
Villages in Tirana County